Jacques Rouxel (26 February 1931 – 25 April 2004), born in Cherbourg, France, was a film animator. He is said to have been on a par with Tex Avery.  Rouxel is perhaps best known for his initially controversial animated French TV series Les Shadoks, which first appeared in 1968.

Rouxel graduated from the Lycée Français de New York in 1946 and obtained a business degree from the École des Hautes études commerciales.

He worked on the prototype of a special machine, the "Animographe", especially designed to accelerate the production of animated TV series.

References

External links

1931 births
2004 deaths
People from Cherbourg-Octeville
French animators
French animated film directors
French television directors
Lycée Français de New York alumni